The New Orleans metropolitan area, designated the New Orleans–Metairie metropolitan statistical area by the U.S. Office of Management and Budget, or simply Greater New Orleans, is a metropolitan statistical area designated by the United States Census Bureau encompassing eight Louisiana parishes—the equivalent of counties in other U.S. states—centered on the city of New Orleans. The population of Greater New Orleans was 1,271,845 in 2020, up from 1,189,166 at the 2010 United States census. According to 2017 census estimates, the broader New Orleans–Metairie–Hammond combined statistical area (CSA) had a population of 1,510,562.

The New Orleans metropolitan area was hit by Hurricane Katrina—once a category 5 hurricane, but a category 3 storm at landfall—on August 29, 2005. Within the city of New Orleans proper, multiple breaches and structural failures occurred in the system of levees and flood walls designed under federal government auspices. The city of New Orleans experienced a steep population decline after the hurricane.

The resulting decline in the city's population negatively impacted population numbers for the entire metropolitan area, which had a population of 1.3 million as recorded in the 2000 United States census. Most of the decline in population is accounted for by the decline experienced in the city of New Orleans proper (coterminous with Orleans Parish); the U.S. Census Bureau estimates that the city's population dropped from 453,728 prior to the storm (July 1, 2005) to 389,476, the estimate for 2020.

Economically, the Greater New Orleans area is one of the largest commercial hubs for Louisiana and borders the second largest economically-important area, Greater Baton Rouge. There is one Fortune 500 company in the area, Entergy. The largest companies operating in the New Orleans metropolitan area are Globalstar, AT&T, GE Capital, and the Port of New Orleans. Home to some of Louisiana's most-visited tourist destinations, tourists have spent over $10.05 billion in 2019.

Geography 
For U.S. census purposes, the New Orleans–Metairie metropolitan statistical area includes eight parishes: Jefferson, Orleans (coterminous with the city of New Orleans), Plaquemines, St. Bernard, St. Charles, St. James, St. John the Baptist and St. Tammany.

The U.S. Census Bureau's CSA (combined statistical area) adds Tangipahoa and Washington parishes, to make ten parishes.

According to the New Orleans region's chamber of commerce, GNO, Inc. (formerly Metrovision), the region boasts a civilian labor force of over 650,000 and there are over 65,000 students enrolled in the region's nine universities and eight community/technical colleges.

The Louisiana State Legislature created a commission (the Regional Planning Commission) to be responsible for the planning and development of the New Orleans metropolitan area. The eight parishes covered by the commission are: Jefferson, Orleans, Plaquemines, St. Bernard, St. Charles, St. John the Baptist, St. Tammany and Tangipahoa.

Each parish within the New Orleans metropolitan area and New Orleans–Metairie–Hammond combined statistical areas lie on a very low sea level elevation, though further inland near the Mississippi border its area above sea level increases to 371 feet.

Principal communities

Principal city
 New Orleans

Satellite cities (places with over 50,000 inhabitants)
 Kenner
 Metairie, unincorporated community

Places between 10,000 and 50,000 inhabitants 

 Belle Chasse
 Chalmette
 Covington
 Destrehan
 Estelle
 Gretna
 Hammond
 Harvey
 Jefferson
 LaPlace
 Luling
 Mandeville
 Marrero
 Meraux
 River Ridge
 Slidell
 Terrytown
 Timberlane
 Woodmere

Places with fewer than 10,000 inhabitants 

 Abita Springs
 Ama
 Arabi
 Avondale
 Barataria
 Boutte
 Bridge City
 Convent
 Eden Isle
 Edgard
 Elmwood
 Folsom
 Garyville
 Gramercy
 Hahnville
 Harahan
 Jean Lafitte
 Lacombe
 Lafitte
 Lutcher
 Madisonville
 Montz
 New Sarpy
 Norco
 Paradis
 Pearl River
 Ponchatoula
 Poydras
 Reserve
 St. James
 Saint Rose
 Vacherie
 Violet
 Waggaman
 Westwego

Demographics

The New Orleans metropolitan area was first defined in 1950. Then known as the New Orleans standard metropolitan area (New Orleans SMA), it consisted of three parishes—Orleans, Jefferson, and St. Bernard—and had a population of 685,405. Following a term change by the Bureau of the Budget (present-day U.S. Office of Management and Budget), the New Orleans SMA was called the New Orleans standard metropolitan statistical area (New Orleans SMSA). By the census of 1960, the population had grown to 868,480, a 27% increase over the previous census.

St. Tammany Parish was added the New Orleans SMSA in 1963. The four-parish area had a combined population of 899,123 in 1960 and 1,045,809 in 1970. By the 1980 census, the population had increased by 14% to 1,187,073.

In 1983, the official name was changed to the New Orleans metropolitan statistical area (New Orleans MSA). Two more parishes, St. Charles and St. John the Baptist, were added to the metropolitan area the same year, making a six-parish MSA. The newly defined area had a total of 1,256,256 residents in 1980, but that number had declined to 1,238,816 in 1990.

The New Orleans MSA expanded to eight parishes in 1993 with the inclusion of Plaquemines and St. James. The eight-parish area had a combined population of 1,285,270 at the 1990 census and 1,337,726 in 2000.

The MSA was renamed the New Orleans–Metairie–Kenner metropolitan statistical area in 2003. St. James Parish was removed, and in 2015, re-added to the defined metropolitan area.

At the 2010 U.S. census, the metropolitan statistical area's population grew to 1,189,166. The overall racial composition of the New Orleans metropolitan area was as follows: White 58.2% (non-Hispanic White) 52.4%, Black or African American 32.5%, American Indian 0.8%, Asian 3.5%, some other race 2.8%, two or more races 2.0%, and Hispanic or Latino (of any race) 8.6%. For those under 18, the majority are minority, with only 45.2% being non-Hispanic whites.

The 2019 U.S. census estimates determined the New Orleans metropolitan area's population stood at 1,270,530. In 2020, its population increased to 1,271,845. Of the metropolitan population, 485,267 households made up the area with an average of 2.6 persons per household. An estimated 50% of households were married couples, 7% had a male householder with no female present, 23% female with no male householder present, and 19% non-family households. Roughly 43% of the metropolitan population was married and 57% were unmarried. The Greater New Orleans unmarried population included 40% males and 36% females never married.

In 2019, there were 561,747 housing units and 63% were owner-occupied. Nearly 70% of the households were single unit households, 28% were multi-units and approximately 3% were mobile homes. The median value of owner-occupied housing units was $211,900, about 25% higher than the amount in Louisiana at the time ($172,100). At the 2019 estimates 47% of housing units were from under $100,000 to $100,000 to $200,000. The New Orleans metropolitan area gained 12.5% of move-ins since 2018.

Greater New Orleans had a racial makeup of 51% White Americans, 35% Blacks or African Americans, 3% Asians, 2% from two or more races, and 9% Hispanic or Latinos of any race. The area's median age was 39 and the population made up 52% females and 48% males. Almost 8% of the population were foreign-born with the majority of origins from Latin America and Asia. The predominant language spoken among the racial and ethnic makeup is English only, followed by Spanish. Greater New Orleans residents had an estimated per capita income of $31,889 and median household income of $55,710. Roughly 16.4% of the metropolis lived at or below the poverty line.

Combined statistical area

The New Orleans–Metairie–Hammond combined statistical area (CSA) is made up of ten parishes. The CSA includes two metropolitan areas and two micropolitan area.

Components
 Metropolitan statistical areas (MSAs)
Hammond (Tangipahoa Parish)
 New Orleans–Metairie–Kenner MSA: (Jefferson, Orleans, Plaquemines, St. Bernard, St. Charles, St. James, St. John the Baptist, and St. Tammany Parishes). St. James was added to the New Orleans MSA in 2015.
 Micropolitan statistical areas (μSAs)
 Bogalusa (Washington Parish)
 Picayune (Pearl River County)

Demographics 
At the 2019 American Community Survey, the combined statistical area had a population of 1,507,017. The racial and ethnic makeup of the combined statistical area was 54% White, 33% Black or African American, 3% Asian, 2% from two or more races, and 8% Hispanic or Latino of any race. It had a median household income of $53,766 and per capita income of $30,533. There were 572,520 households and 667,185 housing units. The median value of an owner-occupied housing unit was $202,000 and 6.7% of CSA's population were foreign-born. Over 60% of the New Orleans–Metairie–Hammond combined statistical area's foreign-born population were from Latin America. In 2019, 17.3% of the CSA lived at or below the poverty line.

Economy 

Greater New Orleans is home to one of the busiest ports in the world. Greater New Orleans' single Fortune 500 company is Entergy.

Other companies headquartered in the area include, Globalstar, Textron, Receivables Exchange, Tidewater Marine, and Intralox. Other companies with large operations in the New Orleans MSA include DXC Technology, Folgers, AT&T, and GE Capital to name a few.

The New Orleans area has 88% of the nation's oil rigs off its coast, and is in the top three in the country in oil and gas production. The metropolis boasts a civilian labor force of over 650,000 and there are over 65,000 students enrolled in the region's nine universities and eight community/technical colleges as well as thriving film, technology and healthcare industries. In 2018, New Orleans was documented for its growing technology sector.

Louis Armstrong New Orleans International Airport hosts 15 airlines, 54 nonstop flights, and connects to all U.S. hubs; a new, ground-up terminal opened November 6, 2019. The Port of New Orleans and the Mississippi River operates in the area with more than $296 million capital infrastructure investment for quick container turnaround and increased capacity.

Industrial projects, especially in St. James Parish, were estimated to help the New Orleans metro area add 4,600 jobs in 2018 and 7,600 in 2019, according to an annual economic forecast. The Greater New Orleans economy also benefits from expansions in the health care sector and the National World War II Museum, as well as airport construction. Formosa Petrochemicals' $9.4 billion complex in St. James Parish and Venture Global's $8.5 billion liquefied natural gas export facility at the Port of Plaquemines were planned yet Formosa's construction delayed due to the COVID-19 pandemic. A long-delayed $1.1 billion University Medical Center and the $1 billion Veterans Affairs Medical Center were constructed for the Greater New Orleans metropolitan region.

Sports

Media

Television 
HDTV channels are in green.

†Indicates analog low power station

Radio

AM radio

FM radio

Internet radio

Infrastructure

Transportation 

Louis Armstrong New Orleans International Airport is located to the west of downtown, in the city of Kenner. The airport is currently served by fifteen airlines. Domestic nonstop service is provided to Atlanta, Austin, Baltimore, Birmingham, Boston, Branson, Charlotte, Chicago (O'Hare and Midway), Cincinnati, Cleveland, Columbus, Dallas (DFW and Love Field), Denver, Detroit, Ft. Lauderdale, Houston (Bush Intercontinental and Hobby), Indianapolis, Kansas City, Las Vegas, Los Angeles, Miami, Milwaukee, Minneapolis, Nashville, New York (JFK, LaGuardia, and Newark), Oakland, Orlando (Orlando International and Sanford), Pensacola, Philadelphia, Phoenix, Salt Lake City, San Antonio, San Diego, San Francisco, Seattle, St. Louis, Tampa, and Washington DC (Reagan National and Dulles). International nonstop service is provided to London, Frankfurt, Cancun, Punta Cana, Panama City, and Toronto.

Major highways in the area include Interstate 10, Interstate 12, Interstate 610, Interstate 310, Interstate 510, Interstate 55, and Interstate 59, as well as U.S. Highway 90 and U.S. Highway 61. The Lake Pontchartrain Causeway, a  span that is the world's longest bridge over water, connects Metairie (on the south shore) to Mandeville on the North Shore.

Metropolitan New Orleans is served by six of the seven Class 1 freight railroads operating in North America. Passenger train service is provided by Amtrak on the Crescent, City of New Orleans, and Sunset Limited routes.

The Port of New Orleans is the 3rd-largest port in the United States, as measured by total bulk tonnage exported. According to the same source, the adjoining Port of South Louisiana is the largest port in the United States when measured by the same factor.

Should metropolitan New Orleans appear to be threatened by a severe hurricane, the Louisiana State Police are prepared to enact a contraflow lane reversal program in order to evacuate the metropolitan area as quickly as possible.

Flood control 

The U.S. Army Corps of Engineers is responsible for the design and construction of Greater New Orleans' flood protection system. In 2007, Louisiana voters created a new Southeast Louisiana Flood Protection Authority (SLFPA) to coordinate with the Corps of Engineers regarding flood protection issues.
 Bonnet Carré Spillway
 Mississippi Valley Division of the United States Army Corps of Engineers

See also

 New Orleans, Louisiana
 List of metropolitan areas of Louisiana
 Intrastate regions
 Effects of Hurricane Katrina in New Orleans and Reconstruction of New Orleans
 Louisiana census statistical areas
 List of cities, towns, and villages in Louisiana
 List of census-designated places in Louisiana

References

External links
 New Orleans Regional Planning Commission

 
Regions of Louisiana
Geography of Jefferson Parish, Louisiana
Geography of Orleans Parish, Louisiana
Geography of Plaquemines Parish, Louisiana
Geography of St. Bernard Parish, Louisiana
Geography of St. Charles Parish, Louisiana
Geography of St. John the Baptist Parish, Louisiana
Geography of St. Tammany Parish, Louisiana
Geography of St. James Parish, Louisiana

pl:Wielki Nowy Orlean